Women's Antifascist Front may refer to:

Women's Antifascist Front of Yugoslavia
Women's Antifascist Front of Bosnia and Herzegovina
Women's Antifascist Front of Croatia
Women's Antifascist Front of Macedonia

Look from